The Premonition is the fifth full-length album by Firewind and their only album to feature the same line-up as its predecessor. Gus G. said "we basically kept the Allegiance 'winning team' together" much to the apparent surprise of fans.

Creation process
The song writing began in part while in tour supporting the band's previous album Allegiance during which time they wrote 6 titled songs (Remembered, Life Foreclosed, The Silent Code, Mercenary Man, My Loneliness, Head Up High) Gus G. said "Song writing-wise I think all songs are special and once again everyone was involved in the writing" while in the studio they recorded a total of 12 original songs and "a few covers" including their cover of the Michael Sembello song "Maniac". Gus G. also said:

Touring and promotion
Firewind started touring after the completion of the album in January, in which time they filmed the content for the bonus DVD. They are scheduled to tour supporting Kamelot on their "Rule the World Tour" in April through Europe and then in May on their "Tyranny and Bloodshred" tour through North America with Arch Enemy, Dark Tranquillity, and Divine Heresy.

Release history
Unlike previous releases, The Premonition wasn't first released in the band's homeland, Greece, although it was first announced for release there. Instead, it was initially released in Italy and Benelux (Belgium, the Netherlands, and Luxembourg) on 21 March 2008. Then the following day in Germany, Austria, and Switzerland. On 24 March 2008 it was released in Greece, Denmark, Norway, and to a large portion of the rest of Europe. In Spain and Portugal, it was released on 25 March 2008, and the following day in Sweden, Finland, and Hungary. It was released four days later in France, and was released in the United Kingdom on 7 April 2008. It was re-released on vinyl on 3 March 2010, making this their first vinyl release, and including the Japan bonus track "Ride to the Rainbows End".

Singles
The first single from The Premonition, "Mercenary Man", was released on the band's official Myspace page for streaming almost two months before the album's release on 2 February 2008, and one month before the album's release as a maxi-CD exclusively to Greece on 25 February  2008. In-between the two release dates, the band filmed the music video for the song in Sweden with Patric Ullaeus as the producer. "Mercenary Man" entered the Greek Top 50 Singles chart at #6 and is peaked at #5.  Meanwhile, the two singles from their previous album, Allegiance, were still charting in Greece. "Falling to Pieces", which peaked at #11, it was still in at #43, and "Breaking the Silence", which peaked at #16, was still in at #33.

Track listing

B-sides
"Spirits in a Digital World"    (Gus G., Christo) – 4:04 (from the "Mercenary Man" single)
"Mercenary Man [Acoustic]" (Gus G., Papathanasio) – 3:54 (from the "Mercenary Man" single)

Unreleased song
The instrumental song Perasmenes mou Agapes, originally by Manolis Chiotis, was cut at the final stages of the release for copyright reasons. The song had a few live performances by Firewind including at the Gagarin Open Air festival in Athens 2007. It was also played on 12 January 2008 during the filming of Live Premonition but was cut from the DVD.

Bonus DVD
The special edition version of the album comes with O-Card packaging and a bonus DVD with four songs, recorded at a live performance of the album in the Principal theatre in Thessaloniki, Greece, on 12 January 2008, and interviews with all the band members.

"Into the Fire" – 6:34
"Head Up High" – 3:43
"Mercenary Man" – 3:56
"My Loneliness" – 4:01

Personnel
Band members
 Apollo Papathanasio – vocals
 Gus G. – guitars
 Babis Katsionis – keyboards
 Petros Christodoylidis – bass
 Mark Cross – drums

Guest musicians
 Marcus Palsson – backing vocals on tracks 2, 5, 8 & 9

Technical staff
 Fredrik Nordström – mixing, engineering
 Henrik Udd – mixing, engineering
 Rickard Bengtson – engineering
 Gustavo Sazes – artwork
 Patric Ullaeus – photography
 Olga K. – photographs of Mark Cross

Footnotes

External links
Firewind's official website.

2008 albums
Firewind albums
Century Media Records albums
Albums produced by Fredrik Nordström
Albums recorded at Studio Fredman